Bob Patterson is an American television sitcom starring Jason Alexander, produced by Ira Steven Behr. It was directed by Robby Benson and Barnet Kellman. The series premiered on ABC on October 2, 2001, and the final episode aired on October 31 of that year. It was canceled in November 2001 after five of the ten scheduled episodes aired.

Overview
The show revolves around fictitious motivational speaker Bob Patterson, "America's #3 Self Help Guru", who is popular with millions of people across America, thanks to his books I Know More Than You, I Still Know More Than You and the To the Top! franchise. Friction between his job and family occurs partly due to Bob's self-absorbed but insecure nature and complete lack of self-awareness, ironic qualities for someone whose job is supposed to be selflessly motivating others to improve their lives.

Use of character outside of show

After the show's cancellation, Alexander used the concept behind Patterson to create a similar fictional character named Donny Clay, "America's #4 Self-Help Guru." Alexander has toured the United States in character as Clay.

Catchphrases
The character of Bob Patterson had a series of catchphrases:

"No is only yes to a different question."
"The only thing between you and your goals is you.......and your goals."
"You are the U in the Universe."
"To the top!"

Cast
Jason Alexander as Bob Patterson, the main character and the namesake of the show. Despite being a self-help guru, Bob is shown to be insecure and jealous of his surroundings, as shown in many scenes. An example is when his ex-wife Janet returns to live with Bob.
Robert Klein as Landau, Bob's manager and friend. Despite being friends, Landau tends to upset Bob quite frequently, such as when he uses Bob's personal bathroom. He is only referred to as Landau and his first name is never revealed.
Jennifer Aspen as Janet Patterson, Bob's ex-wife who comes back to live with him after becoming celibate. She and Bob decide to stay friends, despite her living in his house and doing personal things such as performing nude yoga in their bedroom.
Chandra Wilson as Claudia, a wheelchair-using woman who works as a secretary for Bob. There are hints that she might be faking her disability, as shown in a scene where Bob catches Claudia standing up from her wheelchair to grab something from a top cabinet.
Jay Paulson as Les, a co-worker and friend of Bob.
Phil Buckman as Vic, a friend of Bob's who works with him.
James Guidice as Jeffrey Patterson, Bob and Janet's son. Despite being in his late teens, Jeffrey is shown to not be very grown or mature and has failed to launch into manhood and is shown as lazy and crude.

Episodes

Reception

Critical
The series received poor reviews. The New York Times critic Caryn James wrote that "the series may be the season's biggest disappointment... Robert Klein yells while Mr. Alexander screeches." In a one-and-a-half-star review for USA Today, Robert Bianco called Chandra Wilson "the only person in the show you can imagine wanting to see again." Los Angeles Times reviewer Howard Rosenberg wrote: "The only character here that's amusingly written is Bob's new assistant, Claudia (Chandra Wilson)."

Ratings
Ratings for Bob Patterson were considered disappointing. The series' premiere drew 9.8 million viewers, while its final episode recorded 7.8 million viewers.

References

External links
 
 

2000s American sitcoms
American Broadcasting Company original programming
2001 American television series debuts
2001 American television series endings
Television series by ABC Studios
Television series by 20th Century Fox Television
English-language television shows